Robert Baker (April 1862 – June 15, 1943) was an American politician and a U.S. Representative from New York from 1903 to 1905.

Biography
Born at Bury St. Edmunds, Suffolk, England, U.K. in April 1862, Baker attended the common schools; immigrated to the United States in 1882, and settled in Albany, New York. He married Gertrude A. Zoller in 1887.

Career
Baker moved to Brooklyn, New York, in 1889. After an unfortunate experience at the hands of a doctor, he became a Christian Scientist. A prominent reformer and follower of the single tax theories of Henry George, he was a founding member of the Citizens Union in 1897, and ran unsuccessfully for election to the State assembly in 1894 and auditor of New York City in 1902.

Elected as a Democrat to the Fifty-eighth Congress, Baler was a U.S. Representative for the sixth district of New York from March 4, 1903 to March 3, 1905.  His single term is office was marked with controversy as Baker stayed true to his reformist philosophy, and quickly earned the nickname "No Pass" Baker for declining  the free railroad passes that were then regularly handed out to legislators by the B & O Railroad. A pacifist, he introduced legislation to disband the United States Military Academy at West Point and another motion condemning the "Bloody Sunday" massacre in St. Petersburg, Russia.

A figure of frequent ridicule in the Brooklyn press, he was unsuccessful candidate for reelection in 1904 to the Fifty-ninth Congress and was the unsuccessful Democratic candidate for election in 1906 to the Sixtieth Congress in the heavily Republican Sixth Congressional District in Brooklyn.

Appointed secretary of the New York City Department of Docks and Ferries in 1906, Baker left that position after three days when John Bensel, Commissioner of the Department of Docks and Ferries, indicated that Baker would be prohibited from public speaking in his new job. Later in life he reversed his pacifist philosophy, and became a strong proponent of war with Nazi Germany, writing poems and letters to the Brooklyn Eagle in support of the cause. He engaged in stone paving and in the general real-estate business in Brooklyn, New York, until his death.

Death
Baker died in Brooklyn, Kings County, New York, on June 15, 1943 at the age of 81. He is interred at The Evergreens Cemetery, Brooklyn, New York, in Plot: Nazareth Section, Lot 936.

References

External links

1862 births
1943 deaths
Democratic Party members of the United States House of Representatives from New York (state)
American pacifists
English emigrants to the United States
Members of the United States House of Representatives from New York (state)